Floyd "Klutei" Robertson (7 January 1937 – 1 January 1983) born in Accra was a Ghanaian professional feather/super feather/lightweight boxer of the 1950s and '60s who won the Ghanaian featherweight title, West African Featherweight Title, and Commonwealth super featherweight title, and was a challenger for the World Boxing Council (WBC) featherweight title, and World Boxing Association (WBA) World featherweight title against Sugar Ramos, and Vicente Saldivar, his professional fighting weight varied from , i.e. featherweight to , i.e. lightweight.

References

External links

Image - Floyd Robertson

1937 births
Featherweight boxers
Lightweight boxers
Boxers from Accra
Place of death missing
Super-featherweight boxers
Year of death missing
Ghanaian male boxers